Ann Cooper Whitall (1716–1797) was a prominent Quaker woman in early America.

Cooper' was born in Woodbury, New Jersey on April 23, 1716. She married James Whitall in 1739 at age 23.  Whitall kept a diary starting in about 1760 that contains important historical insight into the lives of people in the Red Bank area and Quaker family life in colonial times.  

As a devout Quaker, Whitall stayed in her house on October 22, 1777, even though British warships were firing cannon in that direction during the Battle of Red Bank. A cannonball did crash into the very room where Whitall sat working at a spinning wheel.  She moved the spinning wheel down to the basement and kept working.  The battle was a victory for the colonists, and afterwards Whitall opened her house to wounded Hessian soldiers, even though they were the enemy.  She gave them herbal medicines and bandaged their wounds. She is called the Heroine of Red Bank for her actions at that time.  

The Battle of Red Bank took place on the Delaware River in West New Jersey in Gloucester County in what is now National Park, New Jersey. South Jersey folk hero Jonas Cattell ran the entire distance from Haddonfield to Woodbury to warn Colonel Christopher Greene, who commanded the small colonial contingent at nearby Red Bank, that the Hessians, commanded by Count von Donop, were marching towards Red Bank.

Ann and James Whitall had nine children together, six sons and three daughters. Ann Whitall died in 1797 at age 82 during a yellow fever epidemic. Her remains are interred along with her husband's at the Friends Burial Ground in Woodbury, New Jersey.  

The James and Ann Whitall House stands today, preserved, as part of the Red Bank Battlefield county park. Tours are available seasonally. 

Ann Cooper Whitall's brother John Cooper served in the Continental Congress in 1776. Her grandson John Mickle Whitall was a  sea captain and Quaker businessman who manufactured glass bottles in Millville, New Jersey. Her great-granddaughter Hannah Whitall Smith was a speaker and writer. One great-great-granddaughter M. Carey Thomas was a president of Bryn Mawr College. Another great-great-granddaughter was Alys Pearsall Smith, the first wife of Bertrand Russell.

Material on Ann Whitall, including a copy of her diary, is available in the Frank H. Stewart Collection at Rowan University Libraries Archives and Special Collection in Glassboro, New Jersey.

References

External links
http://www.getnj.com/historicroadsides/gloucester.shtml

1716 births
1797 deaths
American Quakers
People from Woodbury, New Jersey